Dan I was the progenitor of the Danish royal house according to Saxo Grammaticus's Gesta Danorum. He supposedly held the lordship of Denmark along with his brother Angul, the father of the Angles in Angeln, which later formed the Anglo-Saxons in England.

Text

See also
 Dan (king)

Notes

References
 Davidson, Hilda Ellis (ed.) and Peter Fisher (tr.) (1999). Saxo Grammaticus : The History of the Danes : Books I-IX. Bury St Edmunds: St Edmundsbury Press. . First published 1979-1980.
 Elton, Oliver (tr.) (1905). The Nine Books of the Danish History of Saxo Grammaticus. New York: Norroena Society. Available online
 Olrik, J. and H. Ræder (1931). Saxo Grammaticus : Gesta Danorum. Available online

Mythological kings of Denmark
Scyldings

